Gransherad Church is a parish church of the Church of Norway in Notodden Municipality in Vestfold og Telemark county, Norway. It is located in the village of Gransherad. It is the church for the Gransherad parish which is part of the Øvre Telemark prosti (deanery) in the Diocese of Agder og Telemark. The white, wooden church was built in a long church design in 1849 using plans drawn up by the architect Hans Linstow. The church seats about 250 people.

History
The earliest existing historical records of the church date back to the year 1369, but that was not the year the church was built. The church was dedicated to Saint Olav and it was possibly built during the 13th century. The building was extensively rebuilt over the years, so that it was difficult to see the stave church character towards the end. It appears from an inspection report from 1668 that the church had open-air corridors surrounding the nave and chancel, but later they were removed when windows were installed on the long wall of the nave. Later, the whole nave was torn down and replaced with a new timber-framed nave. The church eventually fell into disrepair and the best plan for moving forwards was to replace the building. The last service in the old church was held on 11 August 1849, and then the church was demolished on 20-21 August 1849. 

The new church was consecrated on 11 September 1849. The new Gransherad church is a log construction that was built by master builder Halvor Andreas Olsen using plans drawn up by Hans Linstow. The church is a wooden long church with a west tower over the church porch. The choir has the same width as the nave. A sacristy was built in 1939. In 1985, a detached building was built to the south of the church which contains some storage rooms as well as public toilets for the church.

Media gallery

See also
List of churches in Agder og Telemark

References

Notodden
Churches in Vestfold og Telemark
Long churches in Norway
Wooden churches in Norway
19th-century Church of Norway church buildings
Churches completed in 1849
13th-century establishments in Norway